Gerenia is a genus of grasshoppers in the subfamily Catantopinae and tribe Gereniini.  Species can be found in India and Indo-China.

Species 
The Orthoptera Species File. lists:
 Gerenia abbreviata Brunner von Wattenwyl, 1893 (Myanmar: 2 subspecies)
 Gerenia ambulans Stål, 1878
 Gerenia bengalensis Bhowmik & Halder, 1984
 Gerenia dorsalis (Walker, 1870)
 Gerenia intermedia Brunner von Wattenwyl, 1893
 Gerenia kongtumensis Mistshenko & Storozhenko, 1990
 Gerenia mizoramia Kumar & Chandra, 2022
 Gerenia obliquinervis Stål, 1878 - type species (locality India)
 Gerenia pustulipennis (Walker, 1871)
 Gerenia selangorensis Miller, 1935
 Gerenia thai Storozhenko, 2009
 Gerenia waterhousei (Bolívar, 1917)

References

External links 
 

Acrididae genera
Catantopinae 
Orthoptera of Asia
Orthoptera of Indo-China